Monsonia emarginata is a species of plant in the family Geraniaceae native to southern Africa.

Description 
Monsonia emarginata is an annual or occasionally perennial shrub. Leaves are green and the flowers are white.

References 

Geraniaceae
Flora of Southern Africa